is a Japanese manga written and illustrated by Mizuho Kusanagi. It was serialized in Hakusensha's Hana to Yume from December 2005 to March 2009. The individual chapters were then encapsulated and released in nine tankōbon volumes. The series was licensed for an English-language release in North America by Tokyopop between 2008 up to 2011 when Tokyopop's North American publishing company was closed down.

The story follows Keidai Saeki, a teenager who retains memories of his past life as a gladiator in Pompeii. In the present, Keidai is reunited with his past life's wife who has reincarnated as a male; meanwhile his male best friend is reincarnated as a female with feelings for Keidai. Reviews have been mixed about the series with reviewers praising or panning the art style and characters. In Japan, the sixth volume of NG Life was ranked 25th on the Tohan charts.

Plot
Keidai Saeki is a high school student with memories of his past life as Sirix Lucretius Fronto, a gladiator in Pompeii who lost his wife Serena in the eruption of Mount Vesuvius in 79 AD. In the present, he is reunited with Loleus, Sirix's male best friend who reincarnated as a girl named Mii Serizawa, and with Serena, who has reincarnated as a male middle school student named Yuuma Ujoh. Keidai has to deal with the feelings he has for Mii and his past love for Serena. As the series progresses, Keidai meets other people who retain memories of Pompeii and discovers that Sirix's guilt in failing to save his friends is the reason why he retains his memories. When Keidai falls into a coma, he is able to relive the last moments of Pompeii where his actions put Sirix's suffering to rest, allowing him to move on with his life and confess his love to Mii.

Characters

His life is thrown into turmoil after he meets Yuuma Ujoh, the reincarnation of Sirix's wife. Keidai is also linked to his family's incarnations; his mother, was Sirix's younger sister, while his father, was Sirix's rival . He is friends with Mii Serizawa, the reincarnation of Sirix's close friend. He is unaware of Mii's feelings towards him and his own feelings of her. As the series progresses, Keidai's feelings for Mii grow as he starts to distance himself from Sirix's memories.

Yuuma is the reincarnation of Sirix's wife , a maiden who captured the hearts of men with her beauty and kindness. Yuuma retains Serena's feminine face and is often mistaken for a female. As a result, he aims to become more masculine to stop the confusion.  Yuuma develops a secret crush on Mii early in the series, but his feelings are not reciprocated. He decides to give up on those feelings believing Keidai and Mii belong together and tries to push them together in order to help Keidai move on from Serena. It is revealed that Serena was reborn as a boy because in her final moments she felt that had she been a man, she could have been at Sirix's side in the final days of Pompeii, rather than be left behind waiting for him.

Mii is the reincarnation of Sirix's best friend . Serizawa met Keidai in seventh grade when they helped a trapped bird and was the first to learn about his past life. She has a crush on Keidai but remains silent about it, fearing it would ruin their friendship. Serizawa is very popular with boys, though they do not make advances, believing she and Keidai are a couple. In her past life, Loleus helped Sirix meet Serena. Kusanagi reveals Mii's name comes from Serizawa Kamo.

Shinogu is Yuuma's older male cousin and the reincarnation of Serena's overprotective older sister . Like Keidai, he retains memories of his past life, and hates Keidai for abandoning Serena during the volcanic eruption. He has an aversion to hot weather because of his strong memories of that day. He began working as a student teacher at Keidai's high school after Yuuma's family moved to town. Shinogu despises males except for Yuuma, and is a womanizer. Shinogu holds a grudge against Souichi Mikage because in his past life as Delos, he betrayed Aglaia.

The reincarnation of a noblewoman named , Shuna was reborn into a wealthy family and retains memories of Pompeii. She loses them at seventeen when she wishes to move on from her past. Shuna is a kind-hearted young woman willing to help anyone in need. When she was two years old, she called her newborn sister Serena due to their physical resemblance; her parents, misheard and named the child Reina. At the age of 10, Shuna meets Souichi Mikage, who also retains his memories of Pompeii, where he served as her bodyguard henceforth. Shuna initially hates Souichi due to his past betrayal, but her feelings for him grow over time and she falls in love with him.

Reina is Shuna's younger sister who closely resembles Serena and dresses in gothic Lolita-style clothing. She grew up hearing stories of Pompeii and developed a crush on Souichi. After Reina has her confession rejected by Souichi, she runs away and happens upon Keidai and the others. She discovers that he also has memories of Pompeii and brings them to Shuna hoping it would bring back her memories. She is in the same class as Yuuma where their similarities make them seem like twins. Reina and Yuuma grow close as friends and begin to speak to each other about their problems. They connect over their predicament of having romantic feelings for those who only see them as a younger sibling. Reina is later revealed to be the reincarnation of a girl named , a friend of Serena. Her appearance of resembling Serena is explained as Tina's wish to experience the same love Serena has with Sirix.

Souichi is the reincarnation of a mercenary named , who served as a bodyguard to Lady Aglaia in Pompeii but later betrayed her. He retains all of his memories of his life in Pompeii and encounters Reina and Shuna when he is fifteen. After discovering that Shuna still has her memories of being Lady Aglaia, he begins working to regain her trust. Souichi blames himself for her memory's disappearance, claiming that her hatred towards him is the cause. Later in the series, it is revealed that Delos fell in love with Lady Aglaia even though he was mercenary hired by the House of Britius to betray her. After framing Aglaia for murder, Delos sought revenge against the House of Britius and murdered every member of the family.

Publication and conception
NG Life, written and illustrated by Mizuho Kusanagi, had its first chapter published in The Hana to Yume on December 26, 2005. It was then serialized in Hana to Yume beginning with the second chapter on March 20, 2006 and ended its run on March 5, 2009. The first tankōbon volume was released by Hakusensha on November 19, 2006 and the ninth on June 19, 2009. Tokyopop licensed the series in 2008 and released the English adapted tankōbon between March 17, 2009 and April 12, 2011. After Tokyopop was shut down, the license was returned to Hakusensha.

During the planning of NG Life, Mizuho Kusanagi discussed with her editor about having a female lead protagonist allowing the readers to relate more to the protagonist. However, a male lead was settled for and the story was written in a romantic-panic comedy style. Kusanagi planned to end the series in its fourth volume, but wanted to add more to the story as it progressed resulting in more volumes. She also commented that even though she struggled with the plot, she enjoyed drawing the characters in the end. In the final chapter, the author revealed she had planned to pair Keidai with Mii since the beginning.

Volume list

Reception
The sixth volume of NG Life was ranked 25th on the Tohan charts between January 20 and 26, 2009. Erin Jones of Mania.com commented on the unoriginal plot and typical shōjo art but praised the characters' distinctive designs and the art sense used to convey a dramatic scenes. He concludes that the character relationships are the "selling point" of the series. GraphicNovelReporter.com's Courtney Kraft comments that the art style is adequate but criticizes the "kookyness" citing the drama at the end of volume one was necessary to balance it. Comics Worth Reading's Johanna Draper Carlson heavily panned the manga for its art and "two-dimensional characters that are predictable and uninteresting."

References

External links

Shōjo manga
2006 manga
Romantic comedy anime and manga
Supernatural anime and manga
Hakusensha manga